Salome Chepchumba (born 29 September 1982) is a female middle-distance runner from Kenya, who specializes in the 3000 metres steeplechase.

International competitions

Personal bests
3000 metres - 8:51.5 min (2000)
3000 metre steeplechase - 9:26.07 min (2006)

External links

1982 births
Living people
Kenyan female middle-distance runners
Kenyan female steeplechase runners
World Athletics Championships athletes for Kenya
Kenyan female cross country runners